Fangxiang Township is a township in Leishan County, Guizhou, China. , it administers the following seven villages:
Pingxiang Village
Tixiang Village
Shuizhai Village
Douzhai Village
Queniao Village
Getou Village
Maoping Village

References 

Township-level divisions of Guizhou
Leishan County